GKH may refer to:
 Gagauz Halkı, a defunct political party in Moldova
 Gross, Kleinhendler, Hodak, Halevy, Greenberg & Co., an Israeli law firm in Israel
 Greg Kroah-Hartman, American Linux kernel programmer